Dmitri Sergeyevich Kartashov (born 26 August 1994) is a Russian football player who plays for FC Forte Taganrog.

Club career
He made his debut in the Russian Professional Football League for FC Chayka Peschanokopskoye on 28 July 2016 in a game against FC Biolog-Novokubansk. He made his Russian Football National League debut for Chayka on 13 July 2019 in a game against FC Fakel Voronezh.

References

External links
 Profile by Russian Professional Football League

1994 births
People from Rostov Oblast
Sportspeople from Rostov Oblast
Living people
Russian footballers
Association football midfielders
Russian First League players
Russian Second League players
FC Chayka Peschanokopskoye players